Sonny King may refer to:

Sonny King (singer) (1922–2006), American lounge singer
Sonny King (artist) (born 1940), Australian artist
Sonny King (wrestler) (born 1945), ring name of Larry Johnson
Sunny King, pseudonym of the developer of the Primecoin and Peercoin cryptocurrencies